The Metro Athletic Conference is an association of eight high schools and their associated middle/junior high schools located in the northeast region of the U.S. state of Ohio. Four member schools are in Summit County, three are in Portage County, and one in Medina. The league was formed in 2019 and began competition in 2020, comprising all eight members of the former Portage Trail Conference Metro Division. The initial opening of conference play for many sports was put in jeopardy from the ongoing COVID-19 pandemic, with golf being the only sport to begin interscholastic at the outset in early August 2020. Later in Augustupdate it was announced by Ohio Governor Mike DeWine that all sports were allowed to compete under special guidelines outlined by the Ohio High School Athletic Association (OHSAA).

Current members

History
A previous Metro Athletic Conference existed primarily in Mahoning, Trumbull, and Columbiana Counties until 2014. It was founded in 1972 as the Mahoning Valley Conference and renamed Metro Athletic Conference in 1994. The conference merged with the Trumbull Athletic Conference in 2014 and formed the All-American Conference. 

The current Metro Athletic Conference was established in April 2019 after the superintendents of all eight school districts that made up the Portage Trail Conference (PTC) Metro Division voted to move forward with establishing a new league separate from the PTC to begin play in August 2020. Reasons given for leaving the PTC included concerns over officiating, scheduling, and league operations, along with the desire for a third-party commissioner and more educational opportunities. The name had been chosen by the time the split from the PTC was made official in June 2019.

Inaugural season
Interscholastic competition began in August 2020 with golf, but the COVID-19 pandemic put several other sports in jeopardy. Ohio Governor Mike DeWine announced on Tuesday, August 18, that all sports, including contact sports, may proceed with the plans laid out by the Ohio High School Athletic Association. For football this would mean one inter-school scrimmage followed by a modified 6-game regular season with every team qualifying for the state playoffs.  For the Metro Athletic this would mean that each team would play every other school in football except one in 2020.

Conference champions

References

External links

Ohio high school sports conferences